KNTX is a radio station licensed in and serving the Bowie, Texas area with community and oldies programming. It broadcasts on AM frequency 1410 kHz and is under ownership of Henderson Broadcasting Company, LP. Much of the schedule consists of news headlines from ABC News, CBS News, and the Texas State Network with the rest of the schedule filled with community news and classic hits from Cumulus Media Networks' "Classic Hits" satellite feed and more.

The station was assigned the KNTX call sign by the Federal Communications Commission on February 1, 2000.

References

External links
KNTX AM 1410 - Official website

NTX
Oldies radio stations in the United States